Play Me is an album by Harry Belafonte, released in 1973. It would be his final studio album for RCA Records and his last studio album until 1977's Turn the World Around released by Columbia Records.

Track listing
 "Play Me" (Neil Diamond) – 4:07	 
 "And I Love You So" (Don McLean) – 4:37
Guitar solo by David Spinozza	 
 "Mr. Wiffen" (D. Wiffen) – 3:30	 
 "If Only It Were Yesterday" (G. Sklerov) – 4:38
Guitar solo by David Spinozza		 
 "So Close" (Jake Holmes) – 4:09
Duet with Eloise Laws	 
 "Empty Chairs" (Don McLean) – 5:17
Guitar solo by Jay Berliner	 
 "Morningside (For the Children)" (Neil Diamond) – 4:11
Children's Chorus: The Meri Mini Players
 "My Old Man" (Jerry Jeff Walker) – 4:31	 
 "One Step" (K. Dunman) – 3:40	 
 "Long Long Time" (G. White) – 5:13
Duet with Eloise Laws

Personnel
Harry Belafonte – vocals
Eloise Laws – vocals on "So Close" and "Long Long Time" (Photo featured on back of LP sleeve)
Jay Berliner – guitar
David Spinozza – guitar
The Meri Mini Players Children's Chorus – vocals
Production notes:
Jack Pleis – producer
John Cartwright – associate producer, musical director
Robert Freedman – arrangements
Coleridge-Taylor Perkinson – arrangements
Ed Begley – engineer
Jim Crotty – engineer
Mae Cann  – cover art

References

1973 albums
Harry Belafonte albums
RCA Records albums
Albums produced by Jack Pleis